Shva or, in Biblical Hebrew, shĕwa is a Hebrew niqqud vowel sign written as two vertical dots beneath a letter. It indicates either the phoneme  (shva na', mobile shva) or the complete absence of a vowel (/Ø/) (shva nach, resting shva).

Moreover, the vowel  is probably not characteristic of earlier pronunciations such as Tiberian vocalization.

'abducted').

Pronunciation in Modern Hebrew 
In Modern Hebrew, shva is either pronounced  or is mute (Ø), regardless of its traditional classification as shva nach or shva na, see following table for examples. The Israeli standard for its transliteration is  only for a pronounced shva na (i.e., one which is pronounced ), and no representation in transliteration if the shva is mute.

In Modern Hebrew, a shva is pronounced  under the following conditions:

Counterexamples 

 Exceptions to rule 6 include  (not  – 'pianist'),  (not  – 'English'),  (not  – 'we will sprinkle'), several inflections of quinqueliteral roots – e.g.:  (not  – 'he synchronized');  (not  – 'he did stupid things');  (not  – 'he had a flirt') – as well as other, more recent loanwords, e.g.  (not  – 'mantra').

In religious contexts, however, scrupulous readers of the prayers and scriptures do still differentiate properly between Shva Nach and Shva Na (e.g. ).

Traditional classification 

In traditional Hebrew grammar, a shva is categorized according to several attributes of its grammatical context. The three categories of shva relevant to standard grammar of Modern Hebrew are shva na, shva naḥ and the less common shva meraḥef. When discussing Tiberian pronunciation (ca. from the 8th until the 15th century) some shvas are classified as shva ga'ya. The following table summarizes four distinguishing attributes which determine these categories:

 Does the shva supersede a vowel or no vowel in the word's non inflected form?
 Is the preceding letter pointed with a "short" or a "long" niqqud-variant?
 Is the following letter, when , pointed with a dagesh qal or not?
 Is the letter which is pointed with shva assigned to the preceding or to the following syllable?

To help illustrate the first criterion (existence or non-existence of a vowel in the word's non inflected form), the location of the shva (i.e., the place within the word where the lack of vowel is indicated by it) is marked within the phonemic transcription with an orange linguistic zero: Ø; if existing, the corresponding vowel in the basic (non inflected) form of the example is also marked in orange.

Shva Na 
In most cases, traditional Hebrew grammar considers shva na, or the mobile shva, to be an entity that supersedes a vowel that exists in the basic form of a word but not after this word underwent inflection or declension. Additionally, any shva marked under an initial letter is classified shva na.

Merely identifying a given shva as being a shva na offers no indication as to its pronunciation in Modern Hebrew; it is however relevant to the application of standard niqqud, e.g.: a  letter following a letter marked with a shva na may not be marked with a dagesh qal (Modern Hebrew phonology sometimes disagrees with this linguistic prescription, as in  – 'they zapped' – in which the second pe is pointed with a dagesh qal although preceded by a shva na), or: the vowel preceding a letter marked with a shva na must be represented by the "long" niqqud-variant for that vowel: qamats and not pataḥ, tsere and not segol etc.. Furthermore, in standard syllabification, the letter under which a shva na is marked is grouped with the following syllable.

Shva na is sometimes transliterated . Concerning Modern Hebrew pronunciation, however, this symbol is misleading, since it is commonly used in linguistics to denote the vowel schwa, which does not exist in Modern Hebrew.

A shva na can be identified as such by means of the following criteria:
 when marked under the first of two identical letters,

For a more detailed account, see

Shva Naḥ 

Traditional Hebrew grammar defines shva naḥ, or shva quiescens, as indicating the absence of a vowel. In Modern Hebrew, some shvas classified as shva naḥ are nonetheless pronounced  (e.g. the shva under the second dalet in the word  –  – "you (f.) robbed"; see table above).

In all but a small number of cases, a shva not conforming to the criteria listed above is classified shva naḥ. This offers no conclusive indication as to its pronunciation in Modern Hebrew; it is however relevant to the application of standard niqqud, e.g.: a  letter following a letter marked with a shva nacḥ must be marked with a dagesh qal (Modern Hebrew phonology sometimes disagrees with this linguistic prescription, as in  – "to miss" – in which the second pe lacks a dagesh qal although preceded by a shva naḥ), or: the vowel preceding a letter marked with a shva naḥ must be represented by the "short" niqqud-variant for that vowel: pataḥ and not qamats, segol and not tsere etc.. Furthermore, in standard syllabification, the letter under which a shva naḥ is marked is grouped with the preceding syllable.

The Academy of the Hebrew Language's transliteration guidelines specify that shva naḥ should not be represented in transliteration.

Shva Meraḥef 
"Shva meraḥef" is the grammatical designation of a shva which does not comply with all criteria characterizing a shva na (specifically, one marked under a letter following a letter marked with a "short", not a "long", niqqud-variant), but which does, like a shva na, supersede a vowel (or a shva na) that exists in the basic form of a word but not after this word underwent inflection or declension.

The classification of a shva as shva meraḥef is relevant to the application of standard niqqud, e.g.: a  letter following a letter marked with a shva meraḥef should not be marked with a dagesh qal, although the vowel preceding this letter could be represented by the short niqqud-variant for that vowel. This reflects sometimes, but not always, pronunciation in Modern Hebrew, e.g. In standard syllabification, the letter under which a shva meraḥef is marked is grouped with the preceding syllable.

Shva Ga'ya 

Shva ga'ya designates a shva marked under a letter that is also marked with the cantillation mark  ( lit. This "strict application" is found in Yemenite Hebrew.

T'nua hatufa 

Within niqqud, vowel diacritics are sorted into three groups: big, small and fleeting or furtive, sometimes also referred to as long, short and very short or ultrashort. This grouping might have correlated to different vowel lengths in earlier forms of Hebrew (see Tiberian vocalization → Vowels; spoken Israeli Hebrew however does not distinguish between different vowel lengths, thus this orthographic differentiation is not manifest in speech).

As with a shva na, standard (prescribed) syllabification determines that letters pointed with a fleeting vowel diacritic be considered part of the subsequent syllable, even if in modern Hebrew pronunciation this diacritic represents a full-fledged syllable, thus e.g. the phonologically trisyllabic word  ('he placed upright'), pronounced , should standardly be syllabified into only two syllables, .

Comparison table

Unicode encoding 

As of 2016, a separate Unicode symbol for the sheva na has been proposed but not implemented.

See also 
 Niqqud
 Schwa
 Tiberian vocalization
 Arabic diacritic sukūn

Notes 
Long and short niqqud-variants represent identical spoken vowels in Modern Hebrew; the orthographic distinction is, however, still observed in standard spelling.

Bibliography

References 

Niqqud